Josephine Terlecki (born 17 February 1986) is a German shot putter. She qualified for the 2012 Summer Olympics but failed to progress from the qualifying round.

Achievements

References

1986 births
Living people
German female shot putters
Athletes (track and field) at the 2012 Summer Olympics
Olympic athletes of Germany
Sportspeople from Weimar
20th-century German women
21st-century German women